is a Japanese politician and a former member of the House of Councillors (Japan) in the Diet (national legislature).

Career 

A native of Koshigaya, Saitama and graduate of Hokkaido University, she worked at the Ministry of Agriculture, Forestry and Fisheries from 1990 until 2000. In July 2004 she contested the House of Councillors election as a Democratic Party of Japan (DPJ) candidate in the Yamagata At-large district but lost to the incumbent, Liberal Democratic Party (LDP) member Koichi Kishi. At the July 2007 election she again contested the Yamagata district as a DPJ candidate and was successful, claiming 57.3% of the vote. Funayama served as a Parliamentary Secretary for Agriculture, Forestry and Fisheries in the cabinets of prime ministers Yukio Hatoyama and Naoto Kan from September 2009 until September 2010.

In July 2012 Funayama resigned from the DPJ and formed the Green Wind party with three other women Councillors. She sought reelection at the July 2013 election but lost to LDP candidate Mizuho Onuma. Green Wind dissolved at the end of that year.

In December 2015 Funayama announced her intention to contest the 2016 House of Councillors election as an independent.

References

External links 
  in Japanese.

1966 births
Living people
People from Koshigaya, Saitama
Female members of the House of Councillors (Japan)
Members of the House of Councillors (Japan)
Democratic Party of Japan politicians
Hokkaido University alumni